Kateryna Bondarenko was the defending champion, but chose not to participate that year.

Magdaléna Rybáriková won her maiden WTA tour title, defeating Li Na in the final 6–0, 7–6(7–2).

Seeds
The top eight seeds receive a bye into the second round.

Draw

Finals

Top half

Section 1

Section 2

Bottom half

Section 3

Section 4

External links
Draw and Qualifying Draw

Aegon Classic - Singles
Aegon Classic - Singles
Singles

ca:AEGON Classic 2009
fr:Classic de Birmingham 2009
pl:AEGON Classic 2009